Dean Ieremia  (born 20 August 2001) is a Samoan professional rugby league footballer who plays as a er for the Melbourne Storm in the NRL.

Background
Ieremia was born in Fagaloa, Samoa and raised in Melbourne, Australia. While living in Melbourne, he was educated at Sunbury Downs College and then at Mount Ridley College, Craigieburn.

Ieremia played his junior rugby league for the Sunbury Tigers and graduated through the Victorian Thunderbolts system before signing with Melbourne Storm.

Playing career
Ieremia made his NRL debut for Melbourne against Cronulla-Sutherland. He became the fourth player to graduate from the NRL Victoria junior system.  Ieremia played a total of 10 games for Melbourne in the 2021 NRL season and scored six tries as the club won 19 matches in a row and claimed the Minor Premiership.  Ieremia did not play in the club's finals campaign where Melbourne suffered a shock 10-6 loss against eventual premiers Penrith.

References

External links
Melbourne Storm profile

2001 births
Samoan rugby league players
Rugby league wingers
Melbourne Storm players
Samoan emigrants to Australia
Living people